Aleksandar Langović (born February 19, 2001) is a Serbian professional basketball player for Borac Banja Luka of the Championship of Bosnia and Herzegovina and the Second ABA League.

Early career 
Langović joined the youth teams of Mega Basket in 2015. In August 2018, he participated at the Basketball Without Borders Europe camp in Belgrade, Serbia. Langović was selected to the all-tournament team for the 2018–19 season of the Next Generation Tournament. He played a key role in Mega reaching the championship game with 12.0 points, 5.3 rebounds and 2.3 assists per game.

Professional career 
Prior to the 2018–19 ABA League First Division season, Langović was promoted to the Mega Bemax first team. Also, he was added to OKK Beograd team for the 2018–19 Basketball League of Serbia season as a two-way affiliate player. On April 18, 2018, he made his OKK Beograd debut and the first career start in a road win against Dunav with 9 points, 6 rebounds, and 1 assist.

On 18 June 2021, Langović was loaned out to Podgorica.

National team career 
Langović was a member of the Serbian under-16 team that won the bronze medal at the 2017 FIBA Europe Under-16 Championship in Montenegro. Over seven tournament games, he averaged 10.3 points, 6.4 rebounds and 0.4 assists per game. He was a member of the Serbian under-17 team that participated at the 2018 FIBA Under-17 Basketball World Cup in Argentina. Over seven tournament games, he averaged 9.1 points, 7.0 rebounds and 0.6 assists per game.

References

External links 
 Profile at kls.rs
 Profile at aba-liga.com
 Profile at realgm.com

2001 births
Living people
Basketball League of Serbia players
KK Mega Basket players
KK Podgorica players
OKK Beograd players
Serbian expatriate basketball people in Montenegro
Serbian men's basketball players
Small forwards
People from Prijepolje
Power forwards (basketball)